Kate Beveridge  (born 25 July 1985) is a former Australian netball player who played in the ANZ Championship for the Adelaide Thunderbirds in 2008–2010, Melbourne Vixens in 2011–2012 and West Coast Fever in 2013-2017.

Beveridge is known for her long range goal attempts, high arcing shots and very high accuracy rate. She is also known for her unique shooting style, having her arms straight while shooting. She was chosen to play for the Australian Netball Diamonds in 2008-2011. 

Although Beveridge was not included in the 12-player Diamonds squad in 2010, she captained the Diamonds' FastNet team in 2010 as the only player to have played in the 2009 World Netball Series. She also played in the 2011 World Netball Series in Liverpool, working alongside co-captains Susan Pratley and Bianca Chatfield in the FastNet Diamonds' leadership group.

In 2018, Beveridge signed with the Canterbury Tactix playing in the ANZ Championship in New Zealand.

References

2008 Adelaide Thunderbirds profile. Retrieved on 2009-03-12.
Vixens net T-Bird goaler Kate Beveridge. Retrieved on 2010-09-15.

1985 births
Living people
West Coast Fever players
Melbourne Vixens players
Adelaide Thunderbirds players
Mainland Tactix players
ANZ Championship players
Australia international netball players
Perth Orioles players
Western Sting players
Australian Netball League players
Netball players from Western Australia
West Australian Netball League players
AIS Canberra Darters players
Australia international Fast5 players
Australian expatriate netball people in New Zealand